Marc André Meyers (b. 1946) is an American materials scientist, engineer and Distinguished Professor at the University of California, San Diego. Meyers studies and writes about the dynamic behavior of materials, synthesis, processing, impact testing, and characterization of new materials. He also studies the properties of biological materials, and in particular the protective coverings of animals. Abalone shells, toucan beaks, the scales of exotic fish, feathers, piranha teeth, rabbit skin, boxfish, turtle and armadillo carapaces, and pangolin scales are some of the biological materials studied by his group.

Meyers was born in Brazil. In the summer of 2014, he organized a group to follow the Roosevelt-Rondon Scientific Expedition along the "River of Doubt".

Meyers is the recipient of many awards and recognitions and has been inducted as a Fellow of the American Society for Metals (ASM International (society)), The Minerals, Metals & Materials Society (TMS) and the American Physical Society (APS).

In addition to being a researcher, Meyers is also a fiction writer and has published four novels.  These books retell stories and drama from many years of working in university research departments. His novels include:
 "A Dama E O Luxemburgues" ("D'Amour et d'Acier", in French translation)
"Chechnya Jihad"
"Mayan Mars"
"Abscission/Implosion"
"Yanomami: A novel"

References

External links
 "Marc André Meyers"
 https://web.archive.org/web/20140814103222/http://meyersgroup.ucsd.edu/ 
 http://www.utsandiego.com/news/2011/jun/21/engineers-life-20-things-ucsds-marc-meyers-has-don/

University of California, San Diego faculty
Living people
Engineers from California
American materials scientists
Brazilian scientists
Members of the Brazilian Academy of Sciences
Brazilian science fiction writers
1946 births
Fellows of the Minerals, Metals & Materials Society
Fellows of the American Physical Society